Control and Status Register (CSR) is a register in many central processing units and many microcontrollers that are used to store information about instructions received from machines. The CSR is generally placed in the register address 0 or 1 in CPUs and works on the concept of using a comparison of flags (carry, overflow and zero, usually) to decide on various if-then instructions related to electronic decision flows. In digital devices, the control and status registers are described by a register map.

References

Digital registers